In Greek mythology, Leis (Ancient Greek: Ληίδος means "booty, spoil") was a princess as daughter of King Orus of Oraea (former name of Troezen). By the sea-god Poseidon, she became the mother of Althepus who inherited the kingdom and renamed it after him, Althepia.

Notes

References 

 Pausanias, Description of Greece with an English Translation by W.H.S. Jones, Litt.D., and H.A. Ormerod, M.A., in 4 Volumes. Cambridge, MA, Harvard University Press; London, William Heinemann Ltd. 1918. . Online version at the Perseus Digital Library
 Pausanias, Graeciae Descriptio. 3 vols. Leipzig, Teubner. 1903. Greek text available at the Perseus Digital Library.

Princesses in Greek mythology
 Women of Poseidon